This is a list of genera in the family Myrmeleontidae, antlions.

Extant Myrmeleontidae genera

 Abatoleon Banks, 1924 i c g
 Acanthaclisis Rambur, 1842 i c g
 Acanthoplectron Esben-Petersen, 1918 a i c g
 Acratoleon Banks, 1915 i c g
 Aeropteryx Riek, 1968 a i c g
 Afghanoleon Hölzel, 1972 i c g
 Ameromyia Banks, 1913 i c g
 Annulares  c g
 Anomaloplectron Esben-Petersen, 1918 a i c g
 Antennoleon New, 1985a i c g
 Araucaleon Banks, 1938 i c g
 Arcuaplectron New, 1985 a i c g
 Argentoleon Stange, 1994 i c g
 Atricholeon Stange, 1994 i c g
 Australeon Miller and Stange, 2012 a i c g
 Austrogymnocnemia Esben-Petersen, 1917 a i c g
 Austroleon Banks, 1909 i c g
 Baliga Navás, 1912 i c g
 Bandidus Navás, 1914 a i c g
 Bankisus Navás, 1912 i c g
 Banyutus Navás, 1912 i c g
 Brachyleon Tillyard, 1916 a i c g
 Brachynemurus Hagen, 1888 i c g b
 Brachyplectron Esben-Petersen, 1925 i c g
 Brasileon Miller and Stange, 1989 i c g
 Brisus Navás, 1931 i c g
 Bullanga Navás, 1917 i c g
 Callistoleon Banks, 1910 a i
 Capicua Navás, 1921 i c g
 Capophanes Banks, 1938 i c g
 Centroclisis Navás, 1909 i c g
 Ceratoleon Esben-Petersen, 1917 a i c g
 Chaetoleon Banks, 1920 i c g b
 Chrysoleon Banks, 1910 a i c g
 Clathroneuria Banks, 1913 i c g b
 Compsoleon Banks, 1913 a i c g
 Cosina Navás, 1912 a i c g
 Crambomorphus McLachlan, 1867 i c g
 Creoleon Tillyard, 1918 i c g
 Csiroleon New, 1985 a i c g
 Cuca Navás, 1923 i c g
 Cueta Navás, 1911 i c g
 Cymatala C.-k. Yang, 1986 i c g
 Cymothales Gerstaecker, 1893 i c g
 Dejuna Navás, 1924 i c g
 Dejunaleon Miller and Stange, 2017 c g
 Delfimeus Navás, 1912 i c g
 Delgadus Navás, 1914 i c g
 Dendroleon Brauer, 1866 a i c g b
 Deutoleon Navás, 1927 i c g
 Dictyoleon Esben-Petersen, 1923 i c g
 Dimarella Banks, 1913 i c g
 Dimares Hagen, 1866 i c g
 Distoleon Banks, 1910 a i c g
 Distonemurus Krivokhatsky, 1992 i c g
 Distoplectron Banks, 1943 a i c g
 Doblina Navás, 1927 i c g
 Echthromyrmex McLachlan, 1867 i c g
 Ecualeon Stange, 1994 i c g
 Elachyleon Esben-Petersen, 1927 i c g
 Elicura Navás, 1911 i c g
 Enrera Navás, 1915 i c g
 Ensorra Navás, 1915 i c g
 Eophanes Banks, 1931 a i c g
 Epacanthaclisis Okamoto, 1910 i c g
 Epignopholeon Makarkin, 2017 g
 Episalus Gerstaecker, 1885 i c g
 Eremoleon Banks, 1901 i c g
 Escura Navás, 1914 a i c g
 Euptilon Westwood, 1837 i c g b
 Euroleon Esben-Petersen, 1918 i c g
 Exaetoleon Kimmins, 1948 i c g
 Fadrina Navás, 1912 i c g
 Fenestroleon New, 1985 a i c g
 Franzenia Esben-Petersen, 1929 a i c g
 Froggattisca Esben-Petersen, 1915a i c g
 Furgella Markl, 1953 i c g
 Fusoleon New, 1985 a i c g
 Galapagoleon Stange, 1994 i c g
 Ganguilus Navás, 1912 i c g
 Gatzara Navás, 1915 i c g
 Gepella Hölzel, 1968 i c g
 Gepus Navás, 1912 i c g
 Geyria Esben-Petersen, 1920 i c g
 Glenoleon Banks, 1913 a i c g
 Glenurus Hagen, 1866 i c g b
 Gnopholeon Stange, 1970 i c g
 Golafrus Navás, 1912 i c g
 Goniocercus Insom and Carfi, 1988 i c g
 Graonus Navás, 1922 i c g
 Gymnocnemia Schneider, 1845 i c g
 Gymnoleon Banks, 1911 i c g
 Hagenomyia Banks, 1911 a i c g
 Heoclisis Navás, 1923 a i c g
 Holzezus Krivokhatsky, 1992 i c g
 Indoclystus Banks, 1941 i c g
 Indoleon Banks, 1913 i c g
 Indopalpares Insom and Carfi, 1988 i c g
 Iranoleon Hölzel, 1968 i c g
 Isoleon Esben-Petersen, 1931 i c g
 Isonemurus Esben-Petersen, 1928 i c g
 Jaffuelia Navás, 1918 i c g
 Jaya Navás, 1912 i c g
 Kirghizoleon Krivokhatsky and Zakharenko, 1994 i c g
 Lachlathetes Navás, 1926 i c g
 Layahima Navás, 1912 i c g
 Lemolemus Navás, 1911 i c g
 Lopezus Navás, 1913 i c g
 Macronemurus Costa, 1855 i c g
 Madrastra Navás, 1912 i c g
 Maracanda McLachlan, 1875 i c g
 Maracandula Currie, 1901 i c g
 Maula Navás, 1912 i c g
 Megistoleon Navás, 1931 i c g
 Megistopus Rambur, 1842 i c g
 Menkeleon Stange, 1970 i c g b
 Mesonemurus Navás, 1920 i c g
 Mestressa Navás, 1914 a i c g
 Mexoleon Stange, 1994 i c g b
 Millerleon Stange, 1989 i c g
 Mjobergia Esben-Petersen, 1918 a i c g
 Mongoleon Hölzel, 1970 i c g
 Mossega Navás, 1914 a i c g
 Myrmecaelurus Costa, 1855 i c g
 Myrmeleon Linnaeus, 1767 a i c g b
 Nadus Navás, 1935 i c g
 Nannoleon Esben-Petersen, 1928 i c g
 Navasoleon Banks, 1943 i c g
 Naya Navás, 1932 i c g
 Nedroledon Navás, 1914 i c g
 Negrokus Navás, 1930 i c g
 Neguitus Navás, 1912 i c g
 Nelebrachys Navás, 1915 i c g
 Neleinus Navás, 1915 i c g
 Nemoleon Navás, 1909 i c g
 Nepsalus Navás, 1914 i c g
 Nesoleon Banks, 1909 i c g
 Neteja Navás, 1914 i c g
 Neulatus Navás, 1912 i c g
 Neuroleon Navás, 1909 i c g
 Newleon Miller and Stange, 2012 a i c g
 Noaleon Hölzel, 1972 i c g
 Nomes Navás, 1914 i c g
 Nophis Navás, 1912 i c g
 Nosa Navás, 1911 i c g
 Nuglerus Navás, 1912 i c g
 Obus Navás, 1912 i c g
 Omoleon Navás, 1936 i c g
 Palparellus Navás, 1912 i c g
 Palpares Rambur, 1842 i c g
 Palparidius Péringuey, 1910 i c g
 Pamares Mansell, 1990 i c g
 Pamexis Hagen, 1866 i c g
 Paraglenurus van der Weele, 1909 i c g
 Paranthaclisis Banks, 1907 i c g b
 Parapalpares Insom and Carfi, 1988 i c g
 Parvoleon New, 1985 a i c g
 Periclystus Gerstaecker, 1888 a i c g
 Peruveleon Miller & Stange, 2011 i c g b
 Phanoclisis Banks, 1913 i c g
 Phanoleon Banks, 1931 i c g
 Platyleon Esben-Petersen, 1923 a i c g
 Porrerus Navás, 1913 i c g
 Protoplectron Gerstaecker, 1885 a i c g
 Pseudimares Kimmins, 1933 i c g
 Pseudoformicaleo van der Weele, 1909 a i c g
 Pseudopalpares Insom and Carfi, 1988 i c g
 Purenleon Stange, 2002 i c g b
 Quinemurus Kimmins, 1943 i c g
 Riekoleon New, 1985 a i c g
 Ripalda Navás, 1915 i c g
 Rovira Navás, 1914 i c g
 Scotoleon Banks, 1913 i c g b
 Sericoleon Esben-Petersen, 1933 i c g
 Sical Navás, 1928 i c g
 Solter Navás, 1912 i c g
 Speleon Miller and Stange, 2012 a i c g
 Stangeleon Miller, 2008 i c g
 Stenares Hagen, 1866 i c g
 Stenogymnocnemia Esben-Petersen, 1923 a i c g
 Stenoleon Tillyard, 1916 a i c g
 Stilbopteryx Newman, 1838 a i c g
 Stiphroneura Gerstaecker, 1885 i c g
 Subgulina Krivokhatsky, 1996 i c g
 Suca Navás, 1921 i c g
 Synclisis Navás, 1919 i c g
 Syngenes Kolbe, 1897 i c g
 Talosus Navás, 1923
 Thaumatoleon Esben-Petersen, 1921 i c g
 Tomatarella Kimmins, 1952 i c g
 Tomatares Hagen, 1866 i c g
 Tricholeon Esben-Petersen, 1925 i c g
 Tyttholeon Adams, 1957 i c g
 Valignanus Navás, 1913 i c g
 Vella Navás, 1913 i c g b
 Vellassa Navás, 1924 c g
 Venezueleon Stange, 1994 i c g
 Visca Navás, 1927 i c g
 Voltor Navás, 1935 i c g
 Weeleus Navás, 1912 i c g
 Xantholeon Tillyard, 1916 a i c g

Fossil Myrmeleontidae genera
 †Araripeneura  c g
 †Bleyeria  c g
 †Blittersdorffia  c g
 †Burmaneura  c g
 †Caldasia  c g
 †Caririneura  c g
 †Choromyrmeleon  c g
 †Cratoalloneura  c g
 †Cratoneura  c g
 †Cratopteryx  c g
 †Diegopteryx  c g
 †Paracaririneura  c g
 †Pseudonymphes  c g

Data sources: i = ITIS, c = Catalogue of Life, g = GBIF, b = Bugguide.net a = Australian Faunal Directory

References

Lists of insect genera